Ivashov is a Russian masculine surname, its feminine counterpart is Ivashova. It may refer to:

 Leonid Ivashov (born 1943), Russian military and public official.
 Vladimir Ivashov (1939—1995), Russian Soviet actor.
 Valentina Ivashova (1915–1991), Soviet film actress.

See also 
 Asteroid 12978 Ivashov, named after Vladimir Ivashov

Russian-language surnames